Birdmen (stylized as BIRDMEN) is a Japanese manga series written and illustrated by Yellow Tanabe. It was serialized in Shogakukan's Weekly Shōnen Sunday from July 2013 to February 2020, with its chapters collected in sixteen tankōbon volumes.

Publication
Birdmen is written and illustrated by Yellow Tanabe. The manga was announced in December 2012. The series began in Shogakukan's Weekly Shōnen Sunday on July 17, 2013. The series went on hiatus from August to November of the same year. After resuming its publication, the manga was released on a monthly basis in the magazine. The series finished on February 5, 2020. Shogakukan compiled its 78 individual chapters into sixteen tankōbon volumes, published from October 18, 2013 to March 18, 2020.

The manga has been licensed in Indonesia by Elex Media Komputindo.

Volume list

References

External links
 Birdmen official website at Web Sunday 
 

Science fiction anime and manga
Shogakukan manga
Shōnen manga